Bicyclobutane is an organic compound with the formula C4H6.  It is a bicyclic molecule consisting of two cis-fused cyclopropane rings, and is a colorless and easily condensed gas.  Bicyclobutane is noted for being one of the most strained compounds that is isolatable on a large scale — its strain energy is estimated at 63.9 kcal mol−1.  It is a nonplanar molecule, with a dihedral angle between the two cyclopropane rings of 123°.

The first reported bicyclobutane was the carboxyethyl derivative, C4H5CO2Et, which was prepared by dehydrohalogenation the corresponding bromocyclobutanecarboxylate ester with sodium hydride.  The parent hydrocarbon was prepared from 1-bromo-3-chlorocyclobutane by conversion of the bromocyclobutanecarboxylate ester, followed by intramolecular Wurtz coupling using molten sodium.  The intermediate 1-bromo-3-chlorocyclobutane can also be prepared via a modified Hunsdiecker reaction from 3-chlorocyclobutanecarboxylic acid using mercuric oxide and bromine:

A synthetic approach to bicyclobutane derivatives involves ring closure of a suitably substituted 2-bromo-1-(chloromethyl)cyclopropane with magnesium in THF.

Stereochemical evidence indicates that bicyclobutane undergoes thermolysis to form 1,3-butadiene with an activation energy of 41 kcal mol−1 via a concerted pericyclic mechanism (cycloelimination, [σ2s+σ2a]).

Biological synthesis 
Multiple research groups have reported success in synthesizing bicyclobutane-containing molecules using enzymes in living cells. One group reported the transformation of linolenic acid into a bicyclobutane fatty acid via a protein produced by a strain of the cyanobacterium Anabaena sp. (strain PCC 7120). The other group reported a directed evolution approach, whereby engineered heme protein was expressed in E. coli and successfully optimized for increased rate and yield of biosynthesis of a substituted bicyclobutane derivative.

See also 
 Propalene (Bicyclobutadiene)
 Bicyclopentane
 1.1.1-Propellane

References

Cyclopropanes
Bicycloalkanes
Gases